Braegarie or Bregary is a clachan on the Mar Lodge Estate in the Cairngorms National Park. Its name means brae – the slope of a river valley – and ghàraidh – a dry stone walled enclosure.

In 1632, the area was sold by the Earl of Mar to Alister Mackenzie to form the Corriemulzie estate.  It then passed to Farquharson of Inverary who sold it to the Earl of Fife in 1785 so that it again became part of the Mar Estate.   

In 1841, three households were recorded.  In 1859, there were three small thatched farmhouses with associated outbuildings.  In 1911, two households were recorded.  One house, which had been built in 1900, was sold to the secretary of the Cairngorm Club in 1982.  It was dilapidated and so was then renovated.

References

Buildings and structures in Aberdeenshire